Brazil has participated at every edition of the Youth Olympic Games since the inaugural summer edition in 2010.  Brazil is ranked 17th on the Summer Games all-time medal table and the country has not yet won a medal at the Winter Youth Olympics.

Medalists

Summer Youth Olympic Games

Source:

Mixed-NOCs teams
Note: Medals awarded at mixed NOCs events are not counted for the respective country in the overall medal table.

Medal tables

Medals by Summer Youth Games

Medals by Winter Youth Games

Medals by Summer Youth Sport

Medals by gender

See also
 Brazil at the Olympics
 Brazil at the Paralympics
 Brazil at the Pan American Games
 Brazil at the Junior Pan American Games

References

 
Nations at the Youth Olympic Games